Breast atrophy is the normal or spontaneous atrophy or shrinkage of the breasts.

Breast atrophy commonly occurs in women during menopause when estrogen levels decrease. It can also be caused by hypoestrogenism and/or hyperandrogenism in women in general, such as in antiestrogen treatment for breast cancer, in polycystic ovary syndrome (PCOS), and in malnutrition such as that associated with eating disorders like anorexia nervosa or with chronic disease. It can also be an effect of weight loss.

In the treatment of gynecomastia in males and macromastia in women, and in hormone replacement therapy (HRT) for trans men, breast atrophy may be a desired effect.

Examples of treatment options for breast atrophy, depending on the situation/when appropriate, can include estrogens, antiandrogens, and proper nutrition or weight gain.

See also
 Mammoplasia
 Micromastia

References

External links 

Breast diseases
Medical terminology